Muhammad Ali and Jerry Quarry fought two boxing matches with each other. The first bout took place on October 26, 1970; and the second on June 27, 1972. Ali won both fights through technical knockouts.

The first fight was stopped in the third round; and the second in the seventh round. The first Ali-Quarry fight is considered particularly notable because it was the first time Ali was fighting after his suspension from boxing.

References

Quarry
1970 in boxing
1972 in boxing
October 1970 sports events
June 1972 sports events